Kikimora is a female house spirit in Slavic mythology, 

Kikimora may also refer to one of the following.

Kikimora, a fairy tale tone poem for orchestra by Anatoly Lyadov
Kikimora Publications, a publishing house associated with the Helsinki University
Kikimora palustris, a genus from the Linyphiidae spider family
 Kikimora, a secondary character from the Puyo Puyo video game series
 Kikimora, from the Disney Channel TV series The Owl House